Thomas in Love is a 2000 Franco-Belgian comedy-drama film directed by Pierre-Paul Renders and written by Philippe Blasband. The film premiered at the 57th Venice International Film Festival, winning the FIPRESCI Award for Best First Feature Film.

It received the Méliès d'Or for Best European Fantastic Film.

References

External links
 

2000 films
2000 drama films
Belgian comedy-drama films
2000s French-language films
French comedy-drama films
Screenlife films
French-language Belgian films
2010s French films
2000s French films